Carlos Franco Gennero Caceres (born 7 April 1979) is an Argentine cyclist. He competed in the men's cross-country mountain biking event at the 2004 Summer Olympics.

Notes

References

1979 births
Living people
Argentine male cyclists
Olympic cyclists of Argentina
Cyclists at the 2004 Summer Olympics
Sportspeople from San Miguel de Tucumán